Lemauga Lydia Sosene (born 14 April 1965) is a New Zealand Labour Party politician. She has been a member of the Māngere-Ōtāhuhu local board since the October 2010 local elections and became a Member of Parliament in 2022, succeeding Louisa Wall.

Personal life
Sosene's parents both emigrated from Samoa to New Zealand in the 1950s. Her father was a founding minister of the Congregational Christian Church in Samoa (EFKS) in Ōtara. Sosene was born in South Auckland in 1965, where she grew up. At some point, her family lived in Henderson in West Auckland. Married to Afoataga Sosene, they live in Favona.

Political career

Local government
Sosene joined the Labour Party in 2000. She was first elected to the Māngere-Ōtāhuhu local board in the 2010 local elections. She was re-elected in the 2013 local elections and 2016 local elections. The board elected her chair in 2013 and returned her to that position in 2016. In her role as chair of the board, Sosene has spoken about the impact of overcrowded housing on Pasifika, and the benefit to Samoans in Auckland of a rise in the minimum wage. She supported the extension of Auckland light rail through the Māngere town centre.

Member of Parliament

At the 2017 general election, Sosene was a list-only candidate placed 44th on the Labour Party list. Labour did not win sufficient representation for Sosene to be elected.

At the 2020 general election, Sosene was again a list only candidate for the Labour Party, ranked 54th. Although Labour won more than 63 seats, the election of twelve lower-ranked or unranked constituency candidates prevented Sosene's election at that time; however, she was still invited to participate in the new MP induction process while waiting for the special votes to be counted. She was the highest-ranked Labour list candidate who was not elected at the general election, but she was sworn in as a Member of Parliament on 2 May 2022, following the resignation of list MP Louisa Wall.

References

1965 births
Living people
New Zealand Labour Party MPs
Members of the New Zealand House of Representatives
New Zealand list MPs
New Zealand Labour Party politicians
New Zealand people of Samoan descent
Unsuccessful candidates in the 2017 New Zealand general election
Unsuccessful candidates in the 2020 New Zealand general election